The 2018–19 FC Rostov season was the club's tenth successive season in the Russian Premier League, the highest tier of football in Russia. They finished the season 9th in the Premier League, and reached the Semifinal of the Russian Cup, where they lost to eventual winners Lokomotiv Moscow.

Season events

Squad

Out on loan

Transfers

In

Out

Loans in

Loans out

Released

Friendlies

Competitions

Russian Premier League

Results by round

Results

League table

Russian Cup

Squad statistics

Appearances and goals

|-
|colspan="14"|Players away from the club on loan:

|-
|colspan="14"|Players who left Rostov during the season:

|}

Goal scorers

Disciplinary record

References

External links

FC Rostov seasons
Rostov